Patrick Cotter O'Brien (19 January 1760 – 8 September 1806) was the second of only twenty two people in medical history to stand at a verified height of . O'Brien was born in Kinsale, County Cork, Ireland. His real name was Patrick Cotter and he adopted O'Brien as his stage name in the sideshow circus, claiming descent from the legendarily gigantic Brian Boru. He was also known as the Bristol Giant and the Irish Giant. Another giant of this period, Charles Byrne, also claimed to be an O'Brien.

He made enough money to retire in 1804 and lived in Hotwells, Bristol until his death. It is believed that he died from the effects of the disease gigantism.

No hearse could be found to accommodate his  casket encased in lead, and his remains were borne to the grave by relays of fourteen men. In his will, Cotter left £2,000 to his mother and a request that his body be entombed within  of solid rock (to prevent exhumation for scientific or medical research).

His grave remained undisturbed for just short of 100 years until March 1906 when workmen accidentally discovered his coffin whilst laying drains. His remains, after being measured and photographed, were reburied.

This made him the tallest person ever at that time, a record that would be surpassed by the next 'eight-footer', John Rogan, who died almost a century later. Patrick Cotter's giant boots are on display in the Kinsale Museum.

An arm of Cotter's is currently preserved in the Medical Museum of the Royal College of Surgeons, London.

See also
List of tallest people
Charles Byrne

References

External links

Images at thetallestman.com

People with gigantism
People from Kinsale
Sideshow performers
1760 births
1806 deaths